Wes Flanigan is an American college basketball coach and current assistant coach for the Auburn Tigers men's basketball team. He is the former head coach for the Little Rock Trojans men's basketball team.

Playing career
Flanigan played at Auburn under Cliff Ellis, where he was an all-SEC selection his junior season. Flanigan finished his career second all-time in assists with 573, and scored 1,228 points, good for 22nd all-time.

Coaching career
Flanigan began his coaching career with a four-year stint at Northwest Mississippi Community College as an assistant coach, before joining Little Rock as an assistant for his first go-around. He followed that up with assistant coaching stops at UAB, Nebraska, and Mississippi St. before returning to Little Rock as an assistant under Chris Beard, where he was part of the Trojans' 2016 NCAA tournament team which defeated Purdue in the first round.

When Beard left for the head coaching position at Texas Tech, Flanigan was elevated to the head coaching position.

In March 2018, the Trojans fired Flanigan after his second season with the team. A month later, on April 16, he was hired by Bruce Pearl to be assistant at his alma mater, Auburn.

Head coaching record

NCAA Division I

References

1974 births
Living people
American men's basketball coaches
American men's basketball players
Auburn Tigers men's basketball players
Auburn Tigers men's basketball coaches
Basketball coaches from Arkansas
Basketball players from Arkansas
Junior college men's basketball coaches in the United States
Little Rock Trojans men's basketball coaches
Mississippi State Bulldogs men's basketball coaches
Nebraska Cornhuskers men's basketball coaches
Sportspeople from Little Rock, Arkansas
UAB Blazers men's basketball coaches